Frans Baert (25 November 1925 – 15 July 2022) was Belgian-Flemish lawyer and politician. He was a member of the Volksunie party, before joining the Sociaal-Liberale Partij.

Life and career
Baert was born in Grembergen on 25 November 1925. He died on 15 July 2022, at the age of 96.

Frans Baert's doctrine
Baert was the founder of a methodology, known in Dutch as Baertdoctrine; regarding Flemish independence. This doctrine, taken by some Flemish politicians, is a step-by-step strategy in order to get an independent Flemish State through democratic reforms of Belgium.

Each reform must follow three basic rules in order to reach a Flemish independence at the end:
 Each reform must be a significant step towards greater autonomy.
 Each reform should not prevent further reforms.
 Inside each reform, the price paid to the other negotiator should not be unreasonable.

References

1925 births
2022 deaths
20th-century Belgian lawyers
People's Union (Belgium) politicians
Sociaal-Liberale Partij politicians
Members of the Senate (Belgium)
Members of the Chamber of Representatives (Belgium)
Members of the Flemish Parliament
People from Dendermonde